The 1936–37 Lafayette Leopards men's ice hockey season was the inaugural season of play for the program. The Leopards represented Lafayette College and were coached by Henry W. Clark and Dale H. Moore in their 1st seasons.

Season
After an aborted attempt at forming an ice hockey team in the 1920, students at Lafayette tried a second time to form a squad in the mid 30s. Two years later, the school's athletic director, Henry W. Clark, announced that the school's first official ice hockey game would take place in February. The Leopards lost their opening match to a collection of Princeton all-stars but produced a credible result considering that it was their first game together.

A second match was arranged for the following week against Swarthmore at Skytop rink, unfortunately, soft ice necessitated the cancellation of the game. The team's second match that season ended up being played against Lehigh at Skytop. It resulted in the first win for the Leopards' program, albeit against a club team.

Roster

Standings

Schedule and results

|-
!colspan=12 style=";" | Regular Season

Scoring statistics

References

External links

Lafayette
Lafayette
Lafayette
Lafayette